The 2015 season for the  cycling team began in January at the Tour Down Under. As a UCI WorldTeam, they were automatically invited and obligated to send a squad to every event in the UCI World Tour.

In December 2014 the UCI announced that the team would be granted a WorldTour licence for the 2015 season.

Team roster

Riders who joined the team for the 2015 season

Riders who left the team during or after the 2014 season

Season victories

Victory originally obtained by Denifl but vacated

National, Continental and World champions 2015

Footnotes

References

External links
 

2015 road cycling season by team
IAM Cycling
2015 in Swiss sport